There have been two baronetcies created for the Knowles family, originally a branch of the Knollys family known as Knollys of Stanford. One is in the Baronetage of Great Britain, which is extant, and one in the Baronetage of the United Kingdom, which is extinct.

History

 
The Knowles Baronetcy, of Lovell Hill in the County of Berkshire, was created in the Baronetage of Great Britain on 31 October 1765 for Charles Knowles, Admiral of the White, Rear-Admiral of Great Britain, Governor of Jamaica and Member of Parliament for Gatton.

He was a descendant of Charles Knowles or Knollys, titular fourth Earl of Banbury. The second Baronet was an admiral in the Royal Navy and created GCB. The third Baronet was a mathematician and Fellow of the Royal Society. The fourth Baronet was a vice-admiral in the Royal Navy. The fifth Baronet was a prehistorian of note. The sixth Baronet was a Fellow of the Royal Society, Professor of Comparative Endocrinology at the University of Birmingham and Professor of Anatomy at King's College London. The seventh Baronet is a chartered architect whose London practice was established in 1984 as Charles Knowles Design, Architects.

The Knowles Baronetcy, of Westwood and Turton Tower in the County of Lancaster, was created in the Baronetage of the United Kingdom on 14 December 1903 for Lees Knowles, Conservative Member of Parliament for Salford West from 1886 to 1906. The title became extinct on his death in 1928.

Knowles baronets, of Lovell Hill (1765)
Lovell Hill was the family residence at Cranbourne in Berkshire.
Sir Charles Knowles, 1st Baronet (1704–1777)
Sir Charles Henry Knowles, 2nd Baronet (1754–1831)
Sir Francis Charles Knowles, 3rd Baronet (1802–1892)
Sir Charles George Frederick Knowles, 4th Baronet (1832–1917)
Sir Francis Howe Seymour Knowles, 5th Baronet (1886–1953)
Sir Francis Gerald William Knowles, 6th Baronet (1915–1974)
Sir Charles Francis Knowles, 7th Baronet (born 1951)
(Charles) William Frederick Lance Knowles (born 1985), heir apparent

Knowles baronets, of Westwood and Turton Tower (1903)
Sir Lees Knowles, 1st Baronet (1857–1928)

See also
Earl of Banbury
Viscount Knollys
Knollys Baronets
Knollys family
 Knowles (disambiguation)
 Knowles (surname)

References

Baronetcies in the Baronetage of Great Britain
Extinct baronetcies in the Baronetage of the United Kingdom
1765 establishments in Great Britain
1903 establishments in the United Kingdom
Knollys family